Defoe may refer to:

People
Defoe (surname), most notably English author Daniel Defoe

Places
Defoe, Webster County, West Virginia, an unincorporated community

Other uses
Defoe (comics), a zombie story
Defoe Shipbuilding Company, a former shipyard in Bay City, Michigan
Operation Defoe, a Second World War reconnaissance by the British Special Air Service
Defoe (horse) (2014–2020), Thoroughbred racehorse

See also
Dafoe (disambiguation)
Foe (disambiguation)